Hurricane Celia was the second-earliest forming Category 5 hurricane in the Eastern Pacific on record, after 1973's Hurricane Ava. Over the following days, the hurricane's winds fluctuated as wind shear impeded significant development hindering it from becoming potentially dangerous. Not long after reaching this strength, wind shear increased and the system entered a dry, stable environment. Over the following 42 hours, Hurricane Celia's sustained winds decreased to tropical storm force and the system began to stall over the open ocean by June 27. Despite highly unfavorable conditions, the storm managed to retain tropical storm status through June 28 and degenerated into a non-convective remnant low that evening. The remnants of Celia drifted northward, completing a counter-clockwise loop, and dissipated on June 30, 2010.

Although Celia remained far away from any populated landmasses, waves from the storm prompted storm advisories along the southern coastline of Mexico. Additionally, its outer bands brought moderate rainfall to parts of Oaxaca and Guerrero. Due to the high intensity and longevity of the hurricane, it significantly contributed to the record-high accumulated cyclone energy value for June 2010 in the eastern Pacific basin.

Origins

The precursor to Hurricane Celia was first identified on June 5, 2010 by the National Hurricane Center (NHC) as a disorganized area of disturbed weather associated with a tropical wave off the western coast of Africa in the Atlantic Ocean. Tracking westward, little development took place and the system eventually crossed Central America and entered the Pacific Ocean on June 17. Situated several hundred miles south-southeast of the Gulf of Tehuantepec, the disturbance moved slowly towards the west-northwest and little development was expected to occur. By June 18, scatterometer data of the system indicated that a surface circulation had developed and the system's overall structure had become increasingly organized. Later that day, a Tropical Cyclone Formation Alert was issued for the system as it was now anticipated to become a tropical cyclone within 48 hours. At this time, convective banding features had begun wrapping around the system; however, it lacked deep, central cloud cover. Further development was expected to be slow due to moderate wind shear in the region of the low. Around 1800 UTC, the system had become sufficiently organized for the NHC to designate it as a tropical depression. Operationally, the depression was not warned upon until early the next morning.

Roughly 18 hours after being classified a depression, deep convection wrapped around the center of the system, prompting the NHC to upgrade the depression to a tropical storm, and to give it the name Celia. Satellite overpasses of the storm revealed that Celia had already begun developing an eye-like feature at the surface, an indication that rapid intensification may ensue. The storm tracked relatively slowly towards the west-southwest in response to a mid-level ridge to the north. By the evening of June 19, Celia displayed a well-organized structure with an eye beginning to appear within the storm's central dense overcast. An intermittent eye was seen on visible satellite image throughout the day, but it failed to fully consolidate by the afternoon of June 21, by which time the system appeared to be vertically tilted, having the low-level circulation displaced to the northeast of the mid-level circulation. Only modest strengthening took place during this time as the system's outflow was being restricted by continuing easterly shear.

Late on June 21, Celia turned due west as it moved around the south side of the ridge previously steering the hurricane to the west-southwest. A secondary eyewall was noted as it made the turn, indicating that the storm would further intensify once this feature further developed. Several hours later, the storm intensified into a Category 2 hurricane on the Saffir–Simpson hurricane scale. After briefly developing a prominent central dense overcast, the storm's structure began to degrade for unknown reasons. By the evening of June 22, Celia was downgraded to a Category 1 hurricane and the eye was no longer apparent on satellite imagery, mainly due to cirrus clouds over the system. The following morning, the eye reformed and the storm became more vertically aligned, allowing Celia to re-attain Category 2 status. Throughout the day, Celia became increasingly organized and intensified, nearly attaining major hurricane status during the afternoon. Operationally, the hurricane was thought to have reached this intensity but post-storm analysis indicated that winds did not exceed .

Peak intensity and dissipation

Although there were no factors inhibiting the development of Celia, the storm unexpectedly weakened again later on June 23. The storm's eye rapidly dissipated and the central dense overcast became asymmetric. Forecaster Todd Kimberlain at the NHC referred to the unexplained shifts in strength as "puzzling." However, as suddenly as the weakening took place, strengthening ensued. Throughout the day, Celia became increasingly organized, with the eye fully reforming and the structure becoming more symmetrical. Rapid intensification soon followed as the storm reached Category 4 status, becoming one of only a handful of tropical cyclones to do so during the month of June in the eastern Pacific. That evening, the storm further intensified into a Category 5 hurricane, the second storm to reach this strength during June in the Eastern Pacific basin on record. The storm also displayed a well-defined eye estimated to be  in diameter.

During the late morning of June 25, Celia started rapidly weakening as it began to take a more northwesterly track into a more hostile environment, with cooler water temperatures and higher wind shear; all of these conditions are highly unfavorable for tropical cyclones. By June 26, convection associated with the hurricane had substantially lessened and cloud tops warmed. The storm also began to resume a westward track as it moved into an area of weaker steering currents. Most of the convection associated with the system had dissipated and the center of circulation became exposed, with only a small area of showers and thunderstorms to the north. Throughout June 27, the system gradually lost its forward momentum over the open water of the Pacific Ocean but managed to maintain minimal tropical storm status longer than initially anticipated.

Intermittent bursts of deep convection kept satellite intensity estimates at  through the morning of June 28. After becoming embedded within a low-level westerly flow, the system began to slowly execute a small counter-clockwise loop. That afternoon, Celia degenerated into a non-convective remnant low-pressure system; operationally, the system was monitored as a tropical depression for an additional six hours before the final advisory from the NHC was issued. The remnants of Celia continued to drift towards the north before finally dissipating on June 30, about 990 mi (1,590 km) southwest of the southern tip of Baja California Sur.

Impact and records

Throughout the hurricane's track, it posed little to no threat to any major landmasses or populated islands. During Celia's early development stages, it brought moderate rainfall to parts of Oaxaca and Guerrero; however, no loss of life or structural damage was reported. Beaches in both states increased the number of lifeguards on duty since the threat of rip currents would remain high for several days. On June 22, the Sistema Nacional de Protección Civil (National System of Civil Protection) in the Mexican state of Jalisco raised the alert level to stage two for coastal areas. People were urged to be cautious about venturing out into coastal waters as the storm produced rough seas near the coast. The alert was later expanded upon to include coastal areas of Michoacán and Colima. Although out of the storm's projected path, a precautionary alert was issued for Socorro Island. However, between June 22 and 23, the outer bands of the storm brought unsettled weather to France's Clipperton Island. Since this island is unpopulated, the NHC did not issue any warnings for it.

During the evening of June 24, Hurricane Celia intensified into a powerful Category 5 storm, further solidifying it as the strongest storm of the 2010 Pacific hurricane season. At its peak, the cyclone attained winds of  along with a minimum pressure of 921 mbar (hPa; 27.2 inHg). This ranks it as the second-strongest June hurricane on record, as well as the eleventh-strongest in the basin, and the second known Category 5 hurricane to develop during the month on record. The strongest and first known storm of this intensity in June was Hurricane Ava in 1973. Additionally, it also marked the first time on record that two consecutive seasons featured Category 5 hurricanes, with Hurricane Rick in October 2009 reaching this intensity, the second time two consecutive seasons had a Category 5 hurricane was when hurricanes Marie and Patricia formed in 2014 and 2015 respectively. In the National Hurricane Center's monthly tropical weather summary for June 2010, it was stated that the accumulated cyclone energy (ACE) for the month was the highest on record, most of which is attributed to Hurricane Celia.

See also

Hurricane Marie (2014)
List of Category 5 Pacific hurricanes
Other tropical cyclones named Celia
Timeline of the 2010 Pacific hurricane season

References

External links

The National Hurricane Center's Eastern Pacific Main Page
The National Hurricane Center's Advisory Archive for Hurricane Celia

2010 Pacific hurricane season
Category 5 Pacific hurricanes
Pacific hurricanes in Mexico
Tropical cyclones in 2010